The 2009 BigPond 300 is the thirtieth event of the 2009 V8 Supercar Championship Series. It was held on the weekend of 20 and 22 November at the Barbagallo Raceway in Western Australia. The two races were won by the two Triple Eight Race Engineering Ford drivers, Jamie Whincup winning on Saturday, Craig Lowndes on Sunday.

Standings
 After Race 24 of 26

References

External links
Official series website
Official results and timing

Perth V8 400
Perth V8 400
Sport in Perth, Western Australia
Motorsport in Western Australia
November 2009 sports events in Australia